Idacarabus is a genus of beetles in the family Carabidae, containing the following species:

 Idacarabus cordicollis Moore, 1967
 Idacarabus longicollis Moore, 1978
 Idacarabus punctipennis Moore, 1994
 Idacarabus troglodytes Lea, 1910

References

Trechinae